Loboschiza is a genus of moths belonging to the subfamily Olethreutinae of the family Tortricidae.

Species
Loboschiza cinnabaritis (Meyrick, 1928)
Loboschiza clytocarpa (Meyrick, 1920)
Loboschiza delomilta (Turner, 1946)
Loboschiza deloxantha (Turner, 1946)
Loboschiza exemplaris (Meyrick, 1911)
Loboschiza furiosa (Meyrick, 1921)
Loboschiza halysideta (Walsingham in Andrews, 1900)
Loboschiza hemicosma (Lower, 1908)
Loboschiza koenigiana (Fabricius, 1775)
Loboschiza martia (Meyrick, 1911)
Loboschiza mediana (Walker, 1866)
Loboschiza thoenarcha (Meyrick, 1911)

See also
List of Tortricidae genera

References

External links
tortricidae.com

Enarmoniini
Tortricidae genera
Taxa named by Alexey Diakonoff